Gravelhanger is a British television mini-series which first aired in 1954. It was described in Radio Times as "the story of an adventure". Broadcast live, it is unknown if the series was telerecorded. Either way, the series is missing, believed lost.

The show starred Peter Coke, Olaf Pooley, Ursula Howells, Christopher Rhodes, Jean Cadell, James Raglan, and Esme Percy.

References

External links
 

1950s British television miniseries
1950s British drama television series
1954 British television series debuts
1954 British television series endings
Lost BBC episodes
Black-and-white British television shows
BBC television dramas